The list of shipwrecks in June 1875 includes ships sunk, foundered, grounded, or otherwise lost during June 1875.

1 June

2 June

3 June

{{shipwreck list item
|ship=Glastry 
|flag=
Five were rescued by Enos Seule, and two by Hippolyte et Marie'''' Glastry was on a voyage from Cork to Newcastle upon Tyne, Northumberland. She was towed in to Portsmouth, Hampshire by the brig Maggie.
}}

4 June

5 June

6 June

7 June

8 June

9 June

10 June

11 June

12 June

13 June

14 June

15 June

16 June

17 June

18 June

19 June

20 June

23 June

24 June

25 June

26 June

27 June

28 June

29 June

30 June

Unknown date

References

Bibliography
Ingram, C. W. N., and Wheatley, P. O., (1936) Shipwrecks: New Zealand disasters 1795–1936.'' Dunedin, NZ: Dunedin Book Publishing Association.

1875-06
Maritime incidents in June 1875